MTV Party To Go ‘99 was the thirteenth album in the MTV Party To Go series.  The album was certified gold on February 24, 1999, by the RIAA.

Track listing
 "No, No, No Part 2" – Destiny's Child featuring Wyclef Jean
 "Still Not a Player" – Big Punisher featuring Joe
 "Superthug" – Noreaga
 "Put Your Hands Where My Eyes Could See" – Busta Rhymes
 "Deja Vu (Uptown Baby)" – Lord Tariq & Peter Gunz
 "Make 'Em Say Uhh!" – Master P., Fiend, The Shocker, Mia X, Mystikal
 "The Rain (Supa Dupa Fly)" – Missy "Misdemeanor" Elliott
 "Show Me Love" – Robyn
 "Shorty (You Keep Playin' with My Mind)" – Imajin featuring Keith Murray
 "Fly" – Sugar Ray
 "As Long As You Love Me" – Backstreet Boys
 "My Heart Will Go On" – Deja Vu
 "Let's Ride" – Montell Jordan featuring Master P. & Silkk "The Shocker"
 "Butta Love" – Next

References

Mtv Party To Go 13
1998 compilation albums
Tommy Boy Records compilation albums
Dance-pop compilation albums
Hip hop compilation albums
Pop compilation albums